Aleksandra Dionisyevna Danilova (Russian: Александра Дионисьевна Данилова; November 20, 1903 – July 13, 1997) was a Russian-born prima ballerina, who became an American citizen. In 1989, she was recognized for lifetime achievements in ballet as a Kennedy Center Honoree.

Early life
Born in Peterhof, Russian Empire on November 20, 1903, she trained at the Russian Imperial Ballet School in Leningrad (now St. Petersburg). She was one of the few Russian-trained ballerinas to tour outside Russia. Her first professional post was as a member of St. Petersburg's Imperial Ballet.

Career
In 1924, she and George Balanchine left Russia. They were soon picked up by Sergei Diaghilev's Ballets Russes; Danilova as a dancer, Balanchine as a choreographer. Danilova toured for years with the Ballets Russes under Sergei Diaghilev, then with the Ballet Russe de Monte Carlo after Diaghilev's death. With the latter company, Danilova and Frederic Franklin created one of the legendary ballet partnerships of the twentieth century. Danilova became known for her glamour and beautiful legs, as well as her work ethic and professionalism.

The Ballet Russe de Monte Carlo presented Gaîté Parisienne in the U.S. for the first time at the Metropolitan Opera House, New York, on 12 October 1938, with Danilova as the Glove Seller. Portraying her as a vivacious, glamorous, sophisticated woman of the world, Danilova in Gaîté became one of the attractions of the Ballet Russe, and the ballet often concluded a season's opening-night performance. On the opening night of the company's 1941 season in New York, when Danilova made her first entrance she was given a spontaneous ovation that stopped the show. Such show-stopping ovations thenceforth became a tradition of every opening-night Gaîté with Danilova.

Danilova made her Broadway debut in 1944's Song of Norway; her last ballet performance was in 1957. She made her musical comedy debut in 1958 in Oh, Captain!. She appeared in a single scene, a dance with the show's star, Tony Randall. (A year later, they performed it on an episode of The Dinah Shore Chevy Show, thus preserving it for posterity.) Unfortunately, Oh, Captain! was not a commercial success and closed a few months later. She was in financial straits when she came across Balanchine on the street in 1964. When he heard of her plight he instantly hired her to teach at the School of American Ballet. In 1965, she sought and received approval from Balanchine to produce a spring workshop performance for the students. These workshops became an important preview for many outstanding dancers. Danilova remained there until her retirement in 1989.

In 1972, she staged a New York City Ballet production of the romantic ballet Les Syphides, under the original title, Chopiniana. 
Two years later, in 1974, Balanchine choreographed a version of Coppélia for the New York City Ballet. He was assisted by Danilova, who had performed the title role many times during her dancing career. She staged the Petipa choreography for Act II.

Danilova had a small, but nostalgically delightful, role (especially for those who knew her earlier work) in the 1977 movie The Turning Point as a ballet coach for upcoming ballerinas.

In 1986 she published an autobiography called Choura, her own personal nickname. The book won the 1986 de la Torre Bueno Prize.

Personal life
She had a long intimate relationship with Balanchine after his divorce from Tamara Geva, from 1926 to 1933, but they never married. They continued their professional partnership long after their romance ended. Danilova, who became an American citizen in 1946, was twice married, to Giuseppe Massera in 1934 and to Casimir Kokitch in 1941.

Ephemera
In Hugh Martin's Look Ma, I'm Dancin' of 1948, a disillusioned would-be dancer contrasts her skills with the talents of some of the leading ballerinas of the day, including Markova and Pavlova. The song includes the line "And as for Alexandra Danilova, I know I'll never make a schlemiel of 'er."

Death
Danilova died on July 13, 1997, in New York. She had a Russian Orthodox funeral service, and was interred at Oakland Cemetery, Sag Harbor, Suffolk County, New York — the same cemetery where George Balanchine is buried.

See also
 List of Russian ballet dancers

References

External links

Archive footage of Alexandra Danilova performing the Sugar Plum variation from The Nutcracker in 1952 at Jacob's Pillow
Archive footage of Alexandra Danilova and Frederic Franklin performing Gaite Parisienne in 1948 at Jacob's Pillow
Alexandra Danilova papers, 1954-1989 Manuscripts and Archives, New York Public Library.

InfoPlease database entry
StreetSwing.com entry
The Ballerina Gallery - Alexandra Danilova

Reviews

1903 births
1997 deaths
Prima ballerinas
Ballet teachers
Russian ballerinas
American ballerinas
Kennedy Center honorees
Ballet Russe de Monte Carlo dancers
Mae L. Wien Faculty Award recipients
White Russian emigrants to the United States
Naturalized citizens of the United States
20th-century American ballet dancers